W.A.K.O. World Championships 2015 in Dublin were the joint 21st edition of the W.A.K.O. world championships.

Overall Medals Standing (Top 7)

See also
List of WAKO Amateur World Championships
List of WAKO Amateur European Championships

References

External links
 WAKO World Association of Kickboxing Organizations Official Site

WAKO Amateur World Championships events